Joseph Samuel Brown (7 May 1920 – May 2004) was an English footballer who played in the Football League as a winger for Chester. He was born in Bebington.

References

1920 births
2004 deaths
People from Bebington
English footballers
Association football wingers
Port Sunlight F.C. players
Chester City F.C. players
Runcorn F.C. Halton players
English Football League players
West Cheshire Association Football League players